Dubovka Urban Settlement is the name of several municipal formations in Russia.

Dubovka Urban Settlement, a municipal formation which the Urban-Type Settlement of Dubovka in Uzlovsky District of Tula Oblast is incorporated as
Dubovka Urban Settlement, a municipal formation which the town of district significance of Dubovka in Dubovsky District of Volgograd Oblast is incorporated as

See also
Dubovka, several inhabited localities in Russia

References

Notes

Sources

